Shannon Pot is a pool in the karst landscape in the townland of Derrylahan near Cuilcagh Mountain in County Cavan, Ireland. An aquifer-fed naturally fluctuating pool, it is the traditional source of the River Shannon. It has connections, through the Shannon Cave system, to other pools, notably two in County Fermanagh. Settlements near the Shannon Pot include Dowra, Blacklion and Glangevlin.

History

An early reference to the Pot is in the Book of Magauran. Poem X, stanza 2, composed c. 1349 by Giolla na Naomh Ó hUiginn, which states,  (In it is the well whence comes the Shannon, noblest stream in Inis Fáil).

Folklore 
According to legend, the Shannon is named after Sionnan, who was the granddaughter of Manannán mac Lir, the god of the sea. She came to this spot to eat the forbidden fruit of the Tree of Knowledge, which was planted by the druids. As she began to eat it, the waters of the pool sprang up and overwhelmed her. She was drawn down into the pool and its water began to flow over the land, forming the River Shannon.

Diving and exploration 
Shannon Pot was first explored by divers Roger Solari and John Elliot on multiple dives in 1971, to a depth of firstly 6, then . Their progress was hampered by submerged tree branches, equipment problems and poor visibility in the dark brown water. The pot was later explored by Martyn Farr, among others, but no further progress was made until the late 2000s.

In December 2008 and January 2009 the pot was dived again  by Alasdair Kennedy and Paul Doig, and subsequently by Artur Kozłowski. After widening the slit and continuing downwards past a loose cobblestone slope, Kozłowski discovered an unstable chamber. A strong current was found to emerge from a tight, unstable shaft in the floor.

Hydrology 
Surveys have defined a  immediate permanent catchment area covering the slopes of Cuilcagh. This area includes Garvagh Lough, 2.2 km to the northeast of the pot. Water from Garvagh drains into Pollnaowen sink, before emerging at Shannon Pot. The highest point in the catchment is a spring at Tiltinbane on the western end of the Cuilcagh mountain ridge; this sources an unnamed stream which itself feeds into Shannon Cave. Further sinks that source the pot include Pollboy and, through Shannon Cave, Pollahune in County Cavan and Polltullyard and Tullyrrakeeragh in Fermanagh.  Surveys suggest that Shannon Pot may once have had a much bigger catchment area. 

It has been shown that in times of high water flow, the pool is hydrologically linked to Badger Pot and Pigeon Pot, located 10.6 km north of the Shannon Pot in the Cuilcagh Mountain area near Florencecourt Forest Park, Fermanagh.

Photography

Notes

References 

Lakes of County Cavan
River Shannon